The Battle of Sirhind was fought between Durrani Empire and Sikh Misls on 14 January 1764.

Battle 
Ahmad Shah Durrani returned to Afghanistan after appointing Zain Khan Sirhindi as the Governor of Sirhind. Zain Khan Sirhindi, the Afghan Governor was attacked by well equipped force of 40,000 Sikhs. In the battle, the Sikhs killed Zain Khan Sirhindi and many other leading officers of the Afghan army. The Sikhs then established their rule between river Satluj to Yamuna. The Sikhs captured Sirhind and later handed over the land to Maharaja Ala Singh of Patiala State. The city's inhabitants faced particularly harsh treatment from the Sikh armies who razed much of the city and made a deliberate policy of destroying the city's buildings and mosques.

References

Sirhind 1764
1764 in India
1760s in the Durrani Empire
Sirhind (1764)
Fatehgarh Sahib district